Sha Sha is the debut album by American indie rock singer, songwriter, multi-instrumentalist and former Radish member Ben Kweller. The album was originally composed of outtakes from sessions for Radish's unreleased album Discount Fireworks.  It was self-released by Kweller, via CD-R, in 2000.  In 2002, ATO Records released a second version of the album with a radically different track listing featuring many new recordings and songs.

Track listing
All tracks written by Ben Kweller except where noted.

2000 CD-R version (PA 101)
"Launch Ramp"
"Next Time"
"Drink Me Away"
"How It Should Be (Sha Sha)" (Joe Butcher/Ben Kweller)
"Wasted and Ready"
"In Other Words"
"What It's Like to Live in Commerce"  (AKA: "Commerce, TX")
"Silent Scene"
"Girl in Between"
"4.40 (Episode 2)"

2002 ATO Records version (07863 68114-2)
"How It Should Be (Sha Sha)"  – 1:49 (Joe Butcher/Ben Kweller)
"Wasted & Ready"  – 3:51
"Family Tree"  – 4:20
"Commerce, TX"  – 3:52
"In Other Words"  – 5:36
"Walk on Me"  – 3:55
"Make It Up"  – 4:50
"No Reason"  – 3:51
"Lizzy"  – 4:06
"Harriet's Got a Song"  – 4:50
"Falling"  – 4:04

2023 20th Anniversary Edition Bonus Discs

Disc 2 (Demos & Outtakes)
"Falling - Brooklyn Demo"
"Walk on Me - Brooklyn Demo"
"Lizzy - Brooklyn Demo"
"Lizzy - LA Demo"
"Ballad of Wendy Baker - Brooklyn Demo"
"How It Should Be (Sha Sha) - Brooklyn Demo" (Joe Butcher/Ben Kweller)
"Walk on Me - Live at The Double Door"
"Make It Up - Brooklyn Demo"
"No Reason - Brooklyn Demo"
"No Reason (feat. Nils Lofgren) Live at The Marquee"

Disc 3 (B-sides & Rarities)
"Today" (William Patrick Corgan)
"Psycho Girl" (Ben Kweller/Jonathan Jeter/Jason McComb)
"I Have the Power"
"Kokomo (with Adam Green)" (Mike Love/Scott McKenzie/Terry Melcher/John Phillips)
"Debbie Don't Worry Doll"
"My Drug Buddy - Live at The Mercury Lounge" (Evan Griffith Dando)
"SHS-10r"
"It's Up to You"
"It's Up to You (feat. Evan Dando) Live at The Brattle Theatre"
"Undone - The Sweater Song (feat. Juliana Hatfield) Live at Fletchers" (Rivers Cuomo)
"Lollipop" (Julius Dixon/Beverly Ross)
"It's Not Fair"

Personnel
Ben Kweller – lead vocals, guitar, piano
John Kent – drums (also backing vocals on PA-101 version)
Josh Lattanzi – bass
Debbie Williams – bass (PA-101 version)
Joe Butcher – bass (PA-101 version)
Jane Scarpantoni – string arrangements
Steve Mazur – engineer
Stephen Harris – producer, mixing, engineer
Roger Greenawalt – producer
C. Taylor Crothers – photography
Mike Waring – photography
Liz Smith – photography
Brett – art direction
Greg Calbi – mastering

Charts

Album

Singles

References

Ben Kweller albums
2002 debut albums
ATO Records albums
Self-released albums